Katajankrunni is a Swedish rock formation or shoal belonging to the Haparanda archipelago. The island is located 14 kilometres south of the town Haparanda. The island has no shore connection and is unbuilt.

References  

Islands of Norrbotten County
Swedish islands in the Baltic